Tension is a 1949 American crime film noir directed by John Berry, and written by Allen Rivkin, based on a story written by John D. Klorer. It stars Richard Basehart, Audrey Totter, Cyd Charisse and Barry Sullivan.

Plot
Police Lieutenant Collier Bonnabel of the homicide department explains to camera that he only knows one way to solve a case: by applying pressure to all the suspects, playing on their strengths and weaknesses, until one of them snaps under the tension. He then cites a murder case involving Warren Quimby.

In flashback, the bespectacled milquetoast Quimby, night manager of the 24-hour Coast-to-Coast drugstore in Culver City, is married to Claire, who is frequently unfaithful to him. Saving and doing without, he is able to afford and willing to purchase a nice house in the suburbs, but she is utterly unimpressed, refusing even to look inside. She eventually leaves him for the latest of her conquests, rich Barney Deager. Quimby foolishly goes to Deager's Malibu beachfront house to try to get his wife back, but she wants nothing to do with him. When Quimby persists, Deager beats him up.

He tells his sympathetic employee, Freddie, what happened. Freddie remarks that if it had been him, he would have killed the man. Deeply humiliated, Quimby takes up Freddie's idea. He constructs a new identity, cosmetics salesman Paul Sothern, buys contact lenses and flashier clothes, and rents an apartment in Westwood. As he is moving in, he meets his new neighbor, beautiful, sweet Mary Chanler, whom he starts dating.

One night Quimby, identifying himself as Paul Sothern, makes a phone call, leaving a message with Narco, Deager's servant, that he will get Deager for some unspecified wrong. On a later night, he hitchhikes to Deager's place, grabs a barbecue spit and fork and walks through the open patio door. He finds Deager asleep in a chair, but cannot go through with the killing. When he drops his weapon, Deager awakes. Quimby grabs the weapon and holds it to Deager's neck, explaining that he came to kill him, but suddenly has realized that Claire is not worth it. Then, seeing that his wife is absent, he mocks Deager, guessing that Claire has said she was going to the movies—the excuse she used while cheating on him. After Quimby leaves, Deager ponders his situation.

Claire later surprises Quimby by returning to him in their Culver City apartment. When he refuses to believe she has come back out of love, she tells him Deager has been murdered. Before Quimby has time to absorb the news, Bonnabel and his partner Lieutenant Gonsales arrive to question them. They know that Claire left the murder scene before they were called. She says that she only went to Deager's place as a day guest to swim regularly and that she and her husband had been Deager's friends for two or three years. Quimby is forced to play along to avoid suspicion. The police are looking for Paul Sothern, the prime suspect. Bonnabel takes Claire on a date, apparently attracted to her.

The police get a break when Mary goes to the Bureau of Missing Persons, concerned about Sothern's disappearance. She brings a photograph. After the photograph is blown up, Bonnabel realizes Sothern and Quimby are the same man. However, Deager was shot, and they do not have the gun. Bonnabel maneuvers Mary to Quimby's workplace to identify him, but she refuses to do so, and states that her faith in Sothern is unshaken.

The police arrest Quimby anyway. Under questioning, he tells them his story, but they find it hard to believe. Next morning, Bonnabel visits Claire that they had to release her husband owing to insufficient evidence. He tells her that since the enquiry has stalled, a new team will be brought in to examine the case. He also says that the gun is the vital clue they need to convict Quimby. Claire retrieves the gun from its hiding place under a rock and plants it in Sothern's apartment. Quimby arrives, followed very shortly by the police. Claire claims she was searching for the gun, and Bonnabel encourages her to continue. She "finds" the gun under a chair cushion, but then Bonnabel explains that all the furnishings had been replaced and that Claire has incriminated herself. Claire is resigned to her fate, but defiantly walks out in the custody of Gonsales. Mary protests that nothing in the apartment has been changed; Bonnabel replies that it would have been too much work. Quimby and Mary are free to resume their relationship.

Cast
 Richard Basehart as Warren Quimby, aka Paul Sothern
 Audrey Totter as Claire Quimby
 Cyd Charisse as Mary Chanler
 Barry Sullivan as Police Lt. Collier Bonnabel
 Lloyd Gough as Barney Deager
 Tom D'Andrea as Freddie, the counter man at Coast to Coast drugstore
 William Conrad as Police Lt. Edgar "Blackie" Gonsales
 Tito Renaldo as Narco, Deager's houseboy

Reception
According to MGM records the film earned $506,000 in the U.S. and Canada and $270,000 elsewhere, resulting in a loss of $229,000.

Walter Addiego, film critic at the San Francisco Examiner, wrote: "They aren't making 'em anymore like this 1949 melodrama by John Berry, and that's too bad. ... What sticks with you about the film is what a classic, prize-winning sap the Basehart character is, how pathetic and ill-considered are his dreams of domestic bliss, and how easily he's able to shift into a new and quite different identity. All in all, a good example of noirish post-war disillusionment — and it has Cyd Charisse and William Conrad to boot."

Shown on the Turner Classic Movies show 'Noir Alley' with Eddie Muller on November 12, 2022.

References

External links
 
 
 
 
 
 Tension informational essay at Film Noir of the Week
 

1949 films
1940s psychological thriller films
American black-and-white films
Film noir
Films scored by André Previn
Films directed by John Berry
Films set in California
Metro-Goldwyn-Mayer films
American psychological thriller films
1940s English-language films
1940s American films